Pisgah National Forest is a National Forest in the Appalachian Mountains of western North Carolina. It is administered by the United States Forest Service, part of the United States Department of Agriculture. The Pisgah National Forest is completely contained within the state of North Carolina. The forest is managed together with the other three North Carolina National Forests (Croatan, Nantahala, and Uwharrie) from common headquarters in Asheville, North Carolina. There are local ranger district offices located in Pisgah Forest, Mars Hill, and Nebo.

Name
Pisgah (פִּסְגָּה) is a Biblical Hebrew word with several meanings: it can be used to describe someone’s best achievement; another meaning is the highest point of a mountain, “summit”. Some translators of the Bible book of Deuteronomy translated the word as a name of a mountain in general, usually referring to Mount Nebo.

History

The Pisgah National Forest was established in 1916, one of the first national forests in the eastern United States. The new preserve included approximately 86,700 acres that had been part of the Biltmore Estate, but were sold to the federal government in 1914 by Edith Vanderbilt. Some of the forest tracts were among the first purchases by the Forest Service under the Weeks Act of 1911. While national forests had already been created in the western United States, the Weeks Act provided the authority required to create national forests in the east as well. Although tracts in the future Pisgah National Forest were among the first purchased under the Weeks Act, the very first to receive formal approval was the  Gennett Purchase in northern Georgia. On March 25, 1921 Boone National Forest was added to Pisgah, and on July 10, 1936, most of Unaka National Forest was added. In 1954 the Pisgah National Forest was administratively combined with the Croatan and Nantahala national forests, collectively known as the National Forests of North Carolina.

American forestry has roots in what is now the Pisgah National Forest. The Cradle of Forestry, (Biltmore Forest School), located in the southern part of the forest, was the site of the first school of forestry in the United States. It operated during the late 19th and early 20th centuries. The school was opened and operated at the direction of George Washington Vanderbilt II, builder of the Biltmore Estate in Asheville. The Forestry Education offered at Biltmore was taught by Carl Schenk. A native German, Schenk was referred to Vanderbilt when Gifford Pinchot resigned to operate the newly formed Division of Forestry. The Cradle of Forestry and the Biltmore Estate played a major role in the birth of the U.S. Forest Service. Today these lands are part of an educational and recreational area in Pisgah National Forest.

Located on the forest property is the Bent Creek Campus of the Appalachian Forest Experiment Station, listed on the National Register of Historic Places in 1993.

Administration
The Pisgah National Forest is divided into 3 Ranger Districts: the Grandfather, Appalachian, and Pisgah districts. The Grandfather and Appalachian Ranger Districts lie in the northern mountains of North Carolina and include areas such as the Linville Gorge Wilderness, Wilson Creek, the watersheds of the Toe and Cane rivers, Roan Mountain, Mount Mitchell, Craggy Gardens, and the Big Ivy/Coleman Boundary area. The Appalachian Ranger District stretches along the Tennessee border from the Great Smoky Mountains National Park north to Hot Springs.
The Appalachian Trail passes through this section of this National Forest.

Geography

Mount Mitchell, in Mount Mitchell State Park, is the highest mountain east of the Mississippi River and lies just outside the boundary of Pisgah National Forest.

The forest also includes tracts surrounding the city of Asheville, the city of Brevard and land in the French Broad River Valley. Recreation includes activities such as hiking, backpacking, and  mountain biking. The land and its resources are also used for hunting, wildlife management, and timber harvesting, as well as the North Carolina Arboretum. The forest lies in parts of 12 counties in western North Carolina. In descending order they are Transylvania, McDowell, Haywood, Madison, Caldwell, Burke, Yancey, Buncombe, Avery, Mitchell, Henderson, and Watauga counties.

Forests and old growth

Rivers and trails
Bent Creek, Mills River, and Davidson River - three major streams and tributaries of the French Broad River - are located in the Pisgah Ranger District, which lies on either side of the Blue Ridge Parkway south of Asheville, along the Pisgah Ridge and Balsam Mountains. Three long-distance recreational trails - the Mountains-to-Sea Trail, the Shut-In Trail, and the Art Loeb Trail travel through this district. Also included in the Pisgah Ranger District are the Shining Rock and Middle Prong Wildernesses. The Blue Ridge Parkway transects this National Forest, and many National Forest and Parkway trails intersect.

Recreation

Pisgah National Forest is a popular place for many activities, such as hiking, backpacking, road biking, mountain biking, fishing, and rock climbing. Popular mountain biking trails include Sycamore Cove Trail, and Black Mountain Loop. Farlow Gap is an expert-level trail, and considered "one of the toughest mountain bike trails in Pisgah National Forest."

Wilderness areas
There are three officially designated wilderness areas lying within Pisgah National Forest that are part of the National Wilderness Preservation System.
 Linville Gorge Wilderness
 Middle Prong Wilderness
 Shining Rock Wilderness

Gallery

See also 

 DuPont State Forest (also popular in western North Carolina for hiking and mountain biking)
 Killing of Judy Smith

References

External links

 Pisgah National Forest
 Images from The Dawn of Private Forestry in America, Covering the Years 1895 to 1914, Forest History Society Library and Archives

 
National Forests of North Carolina
National Forests of the Appalachians
Blue Ridge National Heritage Area
Old-growth forests
Protected areas of Transylvania County, North Carolina
Protected areas of McDowell County, North Carolina
Protected areas of Haywood County, North Carolina
Protected areas of Madison County, North Carolina
Protected areas of Caldwell County, North Carolina
Protected areas of Burke County, North Carolina
Protected areas of Yancey County, North Carolina
Protected areas of Buncombe County, North Carolina
Protected areas of Avery County, North Carolina
Protected areas of Mitchell County, North Carolina
Protected areas of Henderson County, North Carolina
Protected areas of Watauga County, North Carolina
Protected areas established in 1916
1916 establishments in North Carolina
Western North Carolina
Mountain biking in the United States